Cape Sabine is a land point on Pim Island, off the eastern shores of the Johan Peninsula, Ellesmere Island, in the Smith Sound, Qikiqtaaluk Region, Nunavut, Canada.

History
The cape was named after Arctic explorer Sir Edward Sabine (1788–1883),  was the site of the winter camp of Adolphus Greely and the Lady Franklin Bay Expedition in 1883–1884.

Notable people
Edward Israel

References

External links
2004 Recreation of Expedition

Peninsulas of Qikiqtaaluk Region